Andrea Hoover  (born September 9, 1992) is an American professional women's basketball guard formerly with the Los Angeles Sparks of the WNBA and the Dayton Flyers at the University of Dayton.

Hoover appeared in 12 games, including one start, with the Sparks during the 2015 season. She averaged 14.3 minutes and 3.8 points per game.

Dayton statistics

Source

References

External links
 

1992 births
Living people
American women's basketball players
Basketball players from Ohio
Dayton Flyers women's basketball players
Guards (basketball)
Los Angeles Sparks draft picks
Los Angeles Sparks players
People from Bellbrook, Ohio